York Township, Indiana may refer to one of the following places:

 York Township, Benton County, Indiana
 York Township, Dearborn County, Indiana
 York Township, Elkhart County, Indiana
 York Township, Noble County, Indiana
 York Township, Steuben County, Indiana
 York Township, Switzerland County, Indiana

See also

York Township (disambiguation)

Indiana township disambiguation pages